Anzhelika Viktorivna Shevchenko (born 29 October 1987 in Sevastopol) is a Ukrainian (until 2016) and Russian (since 2017) runner who specializes in the middle-distance running events.

Career
She was disqualified for two years due to the doping case since 18 February 2013 till 17 February 2015. All her results since 2 July 2011 were annulled.

In July 2017, it was announced that she is planning to switch her nationality to Russian.

Achievements

References

External links

1987 births
Living people
Ukrainian female middle-distance runners
Sportspeople from Sevastopol
Athletes (track and field) at the 2012 Summer Olympics
Olympic athletes of Ukraine
Doping cases in athletics
Ukrainian sportspeople in doping cases
Russian female middle-distance runners
Naturalised citizens of Russia
Ukrainian emigrants to Russia
Competitors at the 2011 Summer Universiade